Martin Maginnis (October 27, 1841 – March 27, 1919) was a nineteenth-century politician, soldier, publisher, editor and miner from Minnesota and the Montana Territory.

Origins and early life

Maginnis was born in 1841 on his family's farm near Pultneyville, Wayne County, New York, to Patrick and Winnifred Devine Maginnis. His parents came from Ireland, his father from County Clare and his mother from Galway, and they met and married in Liverpool, England. After mixed success in business, Patrick and Winifred Maginnis immigrated to the United States in 1838 and settled in Wayne County, New York. Patrick worked as a contractor on the New York Central Railway. In 1851, the Maginnis family moved west to LaSalle, Illinois where Patrick worked on the Illinois Central railroad. The family next moved to Goodhue Township near Red Wing, Minnesota in 1853. Young Maginnis pursued an education in the public schools and in Minnesota he attended Hamline University, but left early to take charge of a Democratic newspaper. Maginnis had come to know William Wallace Phelps, a lawyer and part owner of the Red Wing Sentinel newspaper, and William J. Colvill, the first editor of the Sentinel. Colvill took young Maginnis under his wing, liberally sharing his library with him and enjoying together the abundant hunting and fishing in the area. By early 1861 Maginnis owned the Red Wing Sentinel, while Phelps edited.

Civil War
At the outbreak of the Civil War, he enlisted as a private in the 1st Minnesota Volunteer Infantry Regiment in 1861. Maginnis was promoted to first lieutenant in 1862, to captain in 1863 and to major of the 11th Minnesota Volunteer Infantry Regiment in 1864. He was ordered to join the Army of the Cumberland where he served under the command of General George H. Thomas until being mustered out along with his regiment in 1865.

Montana Territory
After the War, he moved to Helena, Montana with his brothers in 1866 where he engaged in mining and later in publishing and editing the Helena Daily Gazette. Maginnis was elected a Democrat to the United States House of Representatives in 1872, serving from 1873 to 1885 as the territory's non-voting representative. Afterwards, he was unsuccessful in being elected back to the House of Representatives in 1890, was Commissioner of Mineral Land of Montana from 1890 to 1893 and presented his credentials as a Senator-designate in 1900 to fill a vacancy, but was not seated. Maginnis moved to Los Angeles, California for health reasons in 1915 where he died of gangrene of the foot on March 27, 1919. He was interred in Resurrection Cemetery in Helena, Montana.

Notes

External links
 Finding Aid to MC 50, Martin Maginnis Papers, 1864-1912 at the Montana Historical Society Research Center.
 Martin Maginnis Incoming Correspondence Transcriptions(1964), Merrill G. Burlingame Special Collections Library, Montana State University Collection website.

1841 births
1919 deaths
Delegates to the United States House of Representatives from Montana Territory
Union Army officers
19th-century American newspaper publishers (people)
American newspaper editors
American miners
Hamline University alumni
People from Red Wing, Minnesota
People from Wayne County, New York
Politicians from Los Angeles
People of Minnesota in the American Civil War
Minnesota Democrats
Montana Democrats
Deaths from gangrene
Editors of Minnesota newspapers
Journalists from Montana
19th-century American politicians
Journalists from New York (state)
Military personnel from California